La Pérouse Strait, or Sōya Strait, is a strait dividing the southern part of the Russian island of Sakhalin from the northern part of the Japanese island of Hokkaidō, and connecting the Sea of Japan on the west with the Sea of Okhotsk on the east.

Another small island, Bentenjima, lies near the Japanese shore of the strait.

The strait is named after Jean-François de Galaup, comte de Lapérouse, who explored it in 1787.

Japan's territorial waters extend to three nautical miles into La Pérouse Strait instead of the usual twelve, reportedly to allow nuclear-armed United States Navy warships and submarines to transit the strait without violating Japan's prohibition against nuclear weapons in its territory.

History

Between 1848 and 1892, American whaleships passed through the strait in the spring and summer as they made their way from the right whale grounds in the Sea of Japan to the Sea of Okhotsk to hunt right and bowhead whales. The ship David Paddack (352 tons), Captain Swain, of Nantucket, was bound home with a full cargo when it wrecked in the strait in 1848.

Proposed rail crossing
The Sakhalin–Hokkaido Tunnel has been proposed to connect Japan and Russia under the Strait that connects to the Trans-Siberian Railroad.  A bridge has also been proposed.

References 

Straits of the Pacific Ocean
International straits
Straits of Japan
Straits of Sakhalin Oblast
Landforms of Hokkaido
Pacific Coast of Russia
Japan–Russia border
Japan–Soviet Union relations